Yoram Marciano (born 31 October 1964) is an Israeli politician. He served as a member of the Knesset for the Labor Party from 2006 to 2009, and again between 2012 and 2013.

Biography
Born in Lod, Marciano was first elected to the Knesset in the 2006 elections and served as the Labor-Meimad Parliamentary Group Chairman. Placed seventeenth on the party's list, he lost his seat in the 2009 elections when it was reduced to 13 seats. However, he re-entered the Knesset on 9 December 2012 as a replacement for Amir Peretz, who had left the party to join Hatnuah. He did not contend in the 2013 elections, and subsequently lost his seat.

Marciano has about 70 convictions for traffic law violations. He was also involved in a violent incident in a pub, after which he complained about his own behavior in the ethics committee of the Knesset, and was found guilty.

References

External links

1964 births
People from Lod
Israeli people of Moroccan-Jewish descent
Living people
Israeli Labor Party politicians
Members of the 17th Knesset (2006–2009)
Members of the 18th Knesset (2009–2013)